The 2006 Swindon Borough Council election took place on 4 May 2006 to elect members of Swindon Unitary Council in Wiltshire, England. One third of the council was up for election and the Conservative Party stayed in overall control of the council.

After the election, the composition of the council was
Conservative 40
Labour 14
Liberal Democrat 3
Independent 2

Campaign
19 seats were contested in the election, with a total of 70 candidates standing and 10 sitting councillors not defending their seats. From the parties defending seats in the election these included 19 each from the Conservative and Labour parties and 15 Liberal Democrats. Other candidates included 11 from the Green party, 2 Socialist Unity and 3 independents. The election also saw the British National Party (BNP) stand for Swindon council for the first time, with one candidate, Reg Bates, standing in Gorse Hill and Pinehurst ward. His candidature led a group comprising trade unions, the Labour party, community groups and some independent socialists to form an alliance in opposition to the BNP.

Issues in the election included regeneration, with the different parties proposing different ideas including a library, art gallery, redeveloped car park and the preservation of green spaces. The Conservatives defended their record in control of the council, saying that they had improved services and increased council tax by lower percentages than Labour had when they had been in control of the council. Labour said they would protect services the Conservatives were cutting, deal with anti-social behaviour and criticised the Conservatives for increasing council tax. Meanwhile, the Liberal Democrats said they would stand up for local residents and make the town centre attractive for everyone.

For the election a new website was launched by the council where voters could register in order to get reminders to vote, in an effort to increase turnout.

Election result
The results saw the Conservatives strengthen their control of the council after gaining 5 seats to hold 40 of the 59 seats. 3 of the gains came from Labour who were reduced to 14 seats, with both of Labour's Swindon Members of Parliament blaming the defeats on national issues. The other two Conservative gains were from the Liberal Democrats who fell to 3 seats, while the 2 independent councillors were not defending seats in 2006. Overall turnout in the election was 34.21%, up on the 32.7% in the 2004 election.

Ward results

References

2006 English local elections
2006
2000s in Wiltshire